The People's Khural of the Republic of Buryatia is the regional parliament of Buryatia, a federal subject of Russia. Its 66 deputies are popularly elected every five years. Half of the deputies are elected through a proportional system, and the other half are elected in single-member constituencies with majorities. Independent deputies are self-nominated.

Elections are called by the People's Khural at least three months before the expiration of terms of deputies. Deputies are chosen by the general populace voting for their party's representatives.

The first Chairman of the People's Khural was Mikhail Innokentyevich Semyonov, who is, as of current, the only person to hold the office for two terms in a row.

History
The People's Khural of the Republic of Buryatia was created on July 19, 1994 at the first session of the Khural of the Central Executive Committee of the Buryat ASSR (December 4, 1923 - July 19, 1994). It succeeded the Supreme Council of the Buryat ASSR.

Structure
The People's Khural of Buryatia has six committees:

The Committee of People's Khural of the Republic of Buryatia on Budget, Taxes, Finance and Banks
The Committee of People's Khural of the Republic of Buryatia on the State System, Local Self-Government and Law.
The Committee of People's Khural of the Republic of Buryatia on Land, Agricultural Policy and Consumer Market.
The Committee of People's Khural of the Republic of Buryatia on International and Regional Relations, National Public Organizations and Religious Associations Affairs.
The Committee of People's Khural of the Republic of Buryatia on Social Policy.
The Committee of People's Khural of the Republic of Buryatia on Economic Policy, Natural Resources Utilization and Environmental Protection.

The presiding officer is the Chairman of the People's Khural of Buryatia.

Elections

2018

List of deputies
Single-member constituencies

(Most names in the list place the surname first, with the given name placed second and the patronymic placed third)

Nikolay Dasheyevich Dasheyev (single-member constituency No. 1) United Russia
Dorzhiyev Gennady Yuryevich (single-member constituency No. 2) United Russia
Pashinsky Sergey Georgiyevich (single-member constituency No. 3) United Russia
Budayeva Svetlana Dymbryl-Dorzhiyevna (single-mandate constituency No. 4) United Russia
Dashinimayev Solbon Sandanovich (single-member constituency No. 5) United Russia
Tsyrempilov Valery Zhamsuyevich (single-member constituency No. 6) United Russia
Shvetsov Dmitry Sergeyevich (single-member constituency No. 7) United Russia
Deyeva Liliya Vasilyevna (single-member constituency No. 8) United Russia
Tsydenov Alexander Bazarsadayevich (single-member constituency No. 9) Independent
Kushnaryov Anatoly Grigoryevich (single-mandate constituency No. 10) United Russia
Noskov Pyotr Lukich (single-member constituency No. 11) United Russia
Savelyev Alexander Izotovich (single-member constituency No. 12) United Russia
Krutyan Larisa Nikolayevna (single-member constituency No. 13) United Russia
Tsyrenov Bair Tsydenovich (single-mandate constituency No. 14) Communist Party
Badanov Matvey Aleksandrovich (single-member constituency No. 15) United Russia
Mantatova Tatyana Evgenievna (single-member constituency No. 16) United Russia
Vakhrameev Innokenty Iosifovich (single-mandate constituency No. 17) Communist Party
Zybynov Andreyan Gennadyevich (single-member constituency No. 18) United Russia
Bobkov Igor Alexandrovich (single-member constituency No. 19) United Russia
Stepanov Mikhail Yuryevich (single-member constituency No. 20) United Russia
Namsaryaev Namsaray Vladimirovich (single-member constituency No. 21) Independent
Tsyrenova Ekaterina Dorzhiyevna (single-mandate constituency No. 22) Communist Party
Tsybikov Bator Bulatovich (single-member constituency No. 23) United Russia
Gergenov Mikhail Denisovich (single-member constituency No. 24) United Russia
Igor Markovets (single-member constituency No. 25) United Russia
Viktor N. Yachmenev (single-member constituency No. 26) Fair Russia
Druzhinin Dmitry Konstantinovich (single-member constituency No. 27) Independent
Zhambalov Bair Vladimirovich (single-member constituency No. 28) United Russia
Tsyren-Dashi Erdineevich Dorzhiev (single-member constituency No. 29) United Russia
Igor N. Zubarev (single-member constituency No. 30) United Russia
Garmayev Bair Bazarovich (single-member constituency No. 31) Fair Russia
Ludupova Yevgenia Yuryevna (single-member constituency No. 32) United Russia
Bukholtseva Oksana Vasilyevna (single-mandate constituency No. 33) Fair Russia

Unified constituency (proportional voting)
Bagadayev Alexey Klimentyevich
Bardunayev Alexander Vladimirovich
Batuyev Buda-Shirap Chimitovich
Belykh Leonid Yakovlevich
Chimbeyev Naydan Danzanovich *
Pokatsky Vyacheslav Semyonovich
Vedernikov Vladimir Nikolayevich
Golyuk Oleg Nikolayevich
Gershevich Matvey Matveyevich
Gunzynov Galan Dambiyevich
Dareyev Galsan Evgenyevich
Dondokov Tumen Tsyrendashiyevich
Dorzhiyev Valery Purbuyevich
Dorosh Sergey Dmitriyevich
Zhigzhitov Badmadorzho Sodnombalovich
Zubakov Vasily Georgiyevich
Ivakhinova Inna Sayanovna
Kovalyov Anatoly Yefremovich
Kochnev Valery Grigoryevich
Krasovsky Leonty Alexandrovich
Lonshakov Alexander Revevirovich
Lygdenov Vitaliy Nikolayevich
Malyshenko Victor Anatolyevich
Maltsev Victor Vladimirovich
Matkhanov Irinchey Eduardovich
Mikhailov Igor Andreyevich
Olzoyev Yegor Konstantinovich
Pavlov Vladimir Anatolyevich
Pashinsky Sergey Mironovich
Fyodorov Oleg Ivanovich
Tsybikmitov Zorigto Lubsanovich
Tsybikov Arkady Damdinovich
Tsybikov Vyacheslav Borisovich

On October 17, 2019, at a meeting of the Electoral Commission of Buryatia, a decision was made to include Naydan Chimbeyev as a deputy to replace the single-constituency deputy Munko Buyantuyev after he was convicted of smuggling construction materials into China. Buyantuyev lost his parliamentary powers and freed up a place in the Khural.

See also
List of chairmen of the People's Khural of the Republic of Buryatia

Sources

Buryatia
Politics of Buryatia
Buryatia